The Katse Dam, a concrete arch dam on the Malibamat'so River in Lesotho, is Africa's second largest double-curvature arch dam.  (The Tekezé Dam, completed in early 2009, is now Africa's largest double curvature dam).  The dam is part of the Lesotho Highlands Water Project, which will eventually include five large dams in remote rural areas. The dam is just below the confluence of the Bokong River, which forms the western arm of the Katse reservoir.

The potential of the project was identified by the South African civil engineer Ninham Shand in 1953 as a possible means to supplement the water supply of South Africa's industrial heartland in the Witwatersrand. The World Bank arranged a treaty between the governments of South Africa and Lesotho, allowing the project to proceed.

Construction
The dam was built by a consortium of Bouygues, Concor, Group 5, Hochtief, Impregilo, Kier Group and Sterling International. The dam was completed in 1996 and the reservoir filled with water by 1997. The total cost of the project was US$8 billion.

Environmental impact
The mass of water gave rise to induced seismicity. Farmers who lost land to the project have had trouble re-establishing new livelihoods.  There is little arable land in the mountains to replace all that was lost, and efforts to help them with new livelihoods have by no means been as successful as the engineering works. A local group has documented the project's human legacy in the rural communities directly affected by the project, and the environmental and human-rights NPO, International Rivers, produced a detailed account of the effects. 

As mitigation of the loss of habitat, plant rescue missions were conducted in the area to be flooded, and Katse Botanical Gardens was established to house and propagate the plants rescued.

Water delivery

The dam's high elevation allows a gravity flow water delivery system to South Africa, in addition to hydroelectric power for Lesotho, and was a prime reason behind the choice of site.

Water delivery officially began on 22 January 1998.

In recent years, water from the scheme has also been discharged into the Mohokare (Caledon) River to provide water to Lesotho's capital Maseru in times of shortages. The new dams have filled as anticipated and discharge of water from the dams into the downstream rivers continues in a scheme devised to preserve ecological balances. This discharged water flows to the Senqu (Orange) River, and while preserving the ecological status quo, it benefits only those communities along the rivers. Schemes to provide water supplies to displaced Highlands farmers have not been very successful.

The dam project has also been a source of widespread corruption, which is not uncommon with large dam projects. The Lesotho courts have taken the unusual step of prosecuting the large companies involved in the scandal in addition to the Lesotho bureaucrat who took the bribes. Thus far, there have been a number of convictions and at least one company debarred by the World Bank for its role in the scandal.

Intake tower water transfer 
This will enable the quality of the transferred water to be controlled at all times. Due to the position and design of the intake tower, there is a certain volume of water in the reservoir that cannot be accessed via the transfer tunnels.

Dam features 

Height -  (second tallest in Africa)
Crest length - 
Design - double arch, concrete
Concrete - 

See also
Lesotho Highlands Water Project
Mohale Dam

References

External links
 International Rivers
 Dam crossection
 Dam specifications
 Lesotho Highlands Development Authority
 Transformation Resource Centre

Dams in Lesotho
Hydroelectric power stations in Lesotho
Dams completed in 1996
Energy infrastructure completed in 1996